Street Party was a music video program on MTV that aired Friday nights between the years 1989 and 1992. A companion show to Club MTV, Street Party aired dance videos. Unlike other genre shows like Headbangers Ball and 120 Minutes, Street Party was more of a video block that's length changed each week from 2 to 4 to even once 24 hours. VJ segments are reported to have been taped on the Club MTV set. In 1992, MTV lost interest in dance music and cancelled both Club MTV and Street Party, as well as removing dance videos from general rotation both on MTV and VH1.

MTV original programming
Dance television shows
1989 American television series debuts
1992 American television series endings
1980s American music television series
1990s American music television series